Ioannidis or Ioannides is a Greek surname. The female version of the name is Ioannidou or Ioannides. Ioannidis or Ioannides is a patronymic surname which literally means "the son of Ioannis (Yiannis)", thus making it equivalent to English Johnson. Notable people with surname Ioannidis or Ioannides include:

Men 
 Alkinoos Ioannidis (born 1969), Cypriot composer and singer
 Andreas Ioannides (born 1975), Cypriot football player
 Dimitrios Ioannides (1923–2010), military officer involved in the Greek military junta of 1967-1974
 Evgenios Ioannidis (born 2001), Greek chess player
 Georgios Ioannidis (born 1988), Greek footballer
 Giannis Ioannidis (born 1945), former basketball coach and politician
 John Ioannidis (born 1965), medical researcher
 Matt Ioannidis (born 1994), American football player
 Paul Ioannidis (1924–2021), pilot and resistance fighter
 Perikles Ioannidis (1881-1965), admiral and second husband of Princess Maria Georgievna of Greece and Denmark
 Vassilis Ioannidis (born 1967), Greek footballer

Women 
 Mairi Ioannidou (born 1952), Greek Olympic swimmer
 Noni Ioannidou (born 1958), Greek actress and model
 Sarah Ioannides (born 1972), music director and conductor of the El Paso Symphony Orchestra
 Yiota Ioannidou (born 1971), Cypriot sculptor

Greek-language surnames
Surnames
Patronymic surnames
Surnames from given names